Ballville Township is one of the twelve townships of Sandusky County, Ohio, United States.  As of the 2000 census, 6,395 people lived in the unincorporated portions of the township.

Geography
Located in the southern part of the county, it borders the following townships:
Sandusky Township - north
Riley Township - northeast corner
Green Creek Township - east
Adams Township, Seneca County - southeast corner
Pleasant Township, Seneca County - south
Liberty Township, Seneca County - southwest corner
Jackson Township - west
Washington Township - northwest corner

Part of the city of Fremont, the county seat of Sandusky County, is located in northern Ballville Township, as well as the census-designated place of Ballville.

The Sandusky River runs through Ballville Township prior to Fremont on its way to Lake Erie to the north.

Name and history
Ballville Township was established in 1822 after a petition was submitted to the Sandusky County Commissioners to be set apart as a new township.  Prior to the petition the township was part of the Sandusky Township. It was named for Colonel James V. Ball, a military leader in the War of 1812.

It is the only Ballville Township statewide.

Government
The township is governed by a three-member board of trustees, who are elected in November of odd-numbered years to a four-year term beginning on the following January 1. Two are elected in the year after the presidential election and one is elected in the year before it. There is also an elected township fiscal officer, who serves a four-year term beginning on April 1 of the year after the election, which is held in November of the year before the presidential election. Vacancies in the fiscal officership or on the board of trustees are filled by the remaining trustees.

Township officials

References

External links
Township website
County website

Townships in Sandusky County, Ohio
Townships in Ohio